The Busy World of Richard Scarry is an animated children's television series, produced by CINAR Animation and France Animation in association with Paramount Television, which aired from 1994 to 1997, first on Showtime, later on Nickelodeon, and ran for 65 episodes. The television series was based on the books drawn and written by Richard Scarry. Reruns of the show formerly aired in syndication as part of the Cookie Jar Kids Network block, but the show now continues to air on the Cookie Jar Toons block on This TV until October 26, 2013. Reruns of the show aired on Qubo from May 13, 2013, to September 25, 2016. However, it returned to Qubo on March 28, 2017, as part of the network's Night Owl block until May 26, 2018, and has also aired on Light TV, but has since left the network.

Cast
Sonja Ball as Huckle Cat, additional voices
Keith Knight as Lowly Worm, Harry Hyena, Snozzle, Able Baker Charlie, Soybean Goat, additional voices
Judy Marshak as Fiona Cat, additional voices
Philip Williams as Sergeant Murphy, Bruno Bear, additional voices
Stephen Ouimette as Doctor Lion, Mr. Raccoon, additional voices
Len Carlson as Mr. Frumble, Mr. Gronkle, Mayor Fox, additional voices
Tara Meyer as Sally Cat, additional voices
Cathy Gallant as Hilda Hippo, P.S. Pig, Thump, Deputy Flo, additional voices
John Stocker as John Cat, Mr. Humperdink, Scotty Dog, Pedro, Wolfgang Wolf, additional voices
Rino Romano as Billy Dog, additional voices
David Berni as Bananas Gorilla, additional voices
Peter Wildman as Mr. Fixit, Rudolph von Flugel, Sniff, Pickles, additional voices
Hadley Kay as Sprout Goat, Dennis Elephant, additional voices
Stuart Stone as Kenny Bear (seasons 1-3), Pig Will (seasons 1-3), Pig Won't, Manuel
Linda Feige as Miss Honey (early episodes)
Susan Roman as Cucumber, Professor Dog, April Rhino, Squirty Humperdink, additional voices
Tara Charendoff as Lynnie Raccoon (season 5), Abe, additional voices
Michael Caloz as Kenny Bear (later season 3), Vanderbuilt Gronkle, Robby Lion, Pig Will (season 5)
Julie Lemieux as Russ, additional voices
Lisa Yamanaka as Bridget Murphy
Arthur Holden as Bump
Don Dickinson as additional voices
Keith Hampshire as additional voices
William Colgate as additional voices
Paul Haddad as additional voices

Overview
The series takes place in the fictional city of Busytown and mainly stars Huckle Cat, Lowly Worm and many of the other residents of Busytown. Every "human" in the series is an anthropomorphic animal, most commonly pigs, foxes, breeds of dogs, mice, rabbits, goats, and cats. Each episode always features a conflict (which is eventually resolved in the end). However, episodes featuring other anthropomorphic animals, like Couscous catching Pépé le Gangstaire and his dirty rats, Sam and Dudley, Sneef and Sniff, Cucumber and Pickles, etc. have taken place outside of Busytown in other places around the world.

Episode list

Season 1: 1994

Season 2: 1995

Season 3: 1995–96

Season 4: 1996

Season 5: 1997

Home releases
On July 27, 2010, Mill Creek Entertainment released The Busy World of Richard Scarry: Every Day There's Something New on DVD in Region 1 (US only). This 3-disc set features the first 30 episodes of the series. On July 19, 2011, Mill Creek released The Busy World of Richard Scarry: Fun in Busytown!, a 4-disc set that features the remaining 35 episodes of the series.

On August 4, 2015, Mill Creek Entertainment released The Busy World of Richard Scarry- The Complete Series on DVD in Region 1 which includes bonus episodes of Busytown Mysteries, Wimzie's House and Simon in the Land of Chalk Drawings.

Music
Most of the music was written by two composers. The theme song was written by Sara Zahn and composed by Milan Kymlicka, while the underscore was composed and conducted by Laurent Petitgirard and Steve Wener. Several other composers contributed to several educational shorts in the series.

References

External links
 The Busy World of Richard Scarry at Cookie Jar Entertainment
 

1990s American animated television series
1994 American television series debuts
1997 American television series endings
1990s Canadian animated television series
1994 Canadian television series debuts
1997 Canadian television series endings
1990s French animated television series
1994 French television series debuts
1997 French television series endings
1990s preschool education television series
American children's animated adventure television series
American children's animated fantasy television series
American television shows based on children's books
American preschool education television series
Animated television series about animals
Animated television series about children
Animated television series about families
Animated television series about siblings
BBC children's television shows
Canadian children's animated adventure television series
Canadian children's animated fantasy television series
Canadian preschool education television series
Canadian television shows based on children's books
Family Channel (Canadian TV network) original programming
French children's animated adventure television series
French children's animated fantasy television series
French preschool education television series
French television shows based on children's books
Nick Jr. original programming
Nickelodeon original programming
Showtime (TV network) original programming
Television series by CBS Studios
Television series by Cookie Jar Entertainment